This is a list of Collingwood Football Club players who have made one or more appearance in the Australian Football League (AFL), known as the Victorian Football League (VFL) until 1990. Collingwood were one of the foundation clubs for the inaugural VFL season in 1897.

Collingwood Football Club players

Listed players yet to debut

See also
List of Collingwood Football Club coaches

Notes

References
AFL Tables – All Time Player List – Collingwood

Players
 
Collingwood
Collingwood Football Club players